Sapindus saponaria is a small to medium-sized deciduous tree native to the Americas. Common names include wingleaf soapberry, western soapberry, jaboncillo, sulluku and manele and a'e (Hawaiian). Its genus name, "Sapindus", comes from the Latin, meaning Indian soap, and its specific epithet means "soapy."

Taxonomy 
Two subspecies are recognized:
Sapindus saponaria var. drummondii (Hook. & Arn.) L.D.Benson (syn. S. drummondii Hook. & Arn.) – Western soapberry native from Arizona across to Louisiana in the south ranging north to Kansas and far southwestern Missouri in the north. It is also native to the states of Sonora, Chihuahua, and Coahuila in Mexico.
Sapindus saponaria var. saponaria (syn. S. marginatus Willd., S. thurstonii Rock) – Wingleaf soapberry native almost exclusively to far south Florida in the United States but also occurs in an isolated area of coastal southeast Georgia. It is also found in the Caribbean, Central and South America, and island of Hawaii.

Distribution 
This species has a very wide native range throughout the Americas, ranging from Kansas (with isolated populations known as far north as Montana, Colorado, and Missouri) east to Florida and the West Indies, and south to Paraguay. Populations are also known from isolated oceanic islands, including Clarion Island, the Galápagos Islands, and the Hawaiian Islands.

Description

It often grows in clumps or thickets reaching about 20 ft. (6.1 m) in height in the western part of its range. Solitary trees though can grow as tall as 50 ft. (15.2 m) in height. In the western part of its range it is most often found growing at the head of prairie ravines, the margins of woodlands, the edges of fields or on rocky hillsides.

The leaves of the soapberry are alternate, pinnately compound, thick and leathery but deciduous, 8 in. (20 cm) to 15 in. (38 cm) in length, made up of 6 to 20 narrow lanceolate leaflets with smooth margins, long tapered tips, and uneven wedge-shaped bases which are 2 in. to 5 in. (5 cm to 13 cm) long and .75 in. to 1.5 in. (2 cm to  cm) wide. Midveins on leaves of var. saponaria are mostly winged, while those of var. drummondii are never winged.

The inflorescence are dense terminal panicles of small white flowers 6 in. to 10 in (15 cm to 20 cm) long. Flowering occurs in May–June for var. drummondii and in November for var. saponaria.

The fruit occur in large pyramidal clusters at the ends of branches. Each golden colored fruit is between 1.2 in. to 1.4 in. (3 cm to 3.6 cm) in diameter and becomes translucent and wrinkled when fully mature and contains a single black seed about .35 in (9 mm) in diameter. Fruits of var. drummondii ripen in October and often remain on the tree until spring, while those of var. saponaria ripen in spring. The fruits can contain as much as 37% of saponin, and when macerated in water they produce a soapy lather. Formerly, they were much used in Mexico and in other regions for laundering clothes.

The twigs of var. drummondii are gray-brown and hairy with short tan colored hairs while those of var. saponaria are gray and hairless. Buds on var. drummondii are small dark brown and hairy while those on var. saponaria are small brown and hairless.

The trunk of var. drummondii has light gray, scaly with thin plate like bark and sometimes shallowly furrowed while var. saponaria has gray to reddish colored scaly bark.

Uses and toxicity
The dark round seeds are made into buttons and necklaces. The wood splits easily and is made into baskets.

The fruit of S. drummondii are poisonous and can cause skin rashes; they have been used to stupefy fish. The foliage may also be toxic to livestock.

Notable specimens
The US national champion Sapindus saponaria var. drummondii is located in southern Johnson County, Kansas and measures 59 ft. (18 m) tall, 39 ft. (11.9 m) wide crown spread with a trunk circumference of 10 1/2 ft. (3.2 m) in. at 4 1/2 ft. (1.4 m).
The US national champion Sapindus saponaria var. saponaria is located in Hawaii County, Hawaii and measures 71 ft. (21.6 m) tall, 68 ft. (20.7 m) wide crown spread with a trunk circumference of 160.5 inches (408 cm) at 4 1/2 ft. (1.4 m).

References

External links
 
 

saponaria
Plants described in 1753
Taxa named by Carl Linnaeus
Trees of the North-Central United States
Trees of the Caribbean
Trees of Central America
Trees of Hawaii
Trees of Mexico
Trees of South America
Trees of the Southeastern United States
Trees of the Southwestern United States
Trees of Peru
Saponaceous plants
Flora without expected TNC conservation status